Vishnevetsky is a Ukrainian surname with the Polish equivalent as Wiśniowiecki. 

Notable people with the surname include:

Dmytro Vyshnevetsky (1516–1563), Hetman of the Ukrainian Cossacks
Ignatiy Vishnevetsky (born 1986), Russian-born American film critic and essayist
Igor Vishnevetsky (born 1964), Russian poet

History
House of Wiśniowiecki, a Polish princely family of Ruthenian-Lithuanian origin

Places
Vyshnivets, formerly known as Wiśniowiec, an urban-type settlement in the Ternopil Oblast, Ukraine

See also
Vishnevsky, similar Russian surname
Wiśniewski, similar Polish surname
Vyšniauskas, similar Lithuanian surname

Slavic-language surnames
Ukrainian-language surnames
Polish-language surnames
Russian-language surnames